Mordella pauli is a species of beetle in the genus Mordella of the family Mordellidae, which is part of the superfamily Tenebrionoidea. It was described in 1924 by Maurice Pic.

References

Beetles described in 1924
pauli